General James Thomas Hill (born October 8, 1946) is a retired United States Army four-star general who served as commander of United States Southern Command from 2002 to 2004. Hill also served as the Commanding General, I Corps and Fort Lewis.

Military career
Hill is from El Paso, Texas, and was commissioned into the Infantry following graduation from Trinity University in San Antonio, Texas, in 1968. A graduate of the Command and General Staff College and the National War College, he also holds a master's degree in Personnel Management from Central Michigan University.

After completion of the Infantry Officers Basic, Ranger, and Airborne Courses, and an initial assignment at Fort Hood, Texas, Hill served with the 2–502nd Infantry, part of the 101st Airborne Division (Airmobile), in the Republic of Vietnam as a rifle platoon leader, recon platoon leader, company executive officer, and company commander.

Hill's other key assignments include Company Commander, 3d Ranger Company, Fort Benning and Commander, Company A, 2d Squadron, 7th Cavalry, Fort Hood; Battalion Operations Officer and Battalion Commander, 1–35th Infantry, Schofield Barracks; Staff Officer, Strategy, Plans and Policy Directorate, Office of the Deputy Chief of Staff, HQDA; Aide-de-Camp to the Chief of Staff of the Army, and Special Project Officer for the Chief of Staff of the Army. General Hill commanded the "Always First" Brigade, 101st Airborne Division (Air Assault) from August 1989 through July 1991, to include service in Southwest Asia during Operations Desert Shield and Desert Storm. General Hill served as Chief of Staff of the 101st Airborne Division (Air Assault) from August 1991 through October 1992. General Hill then served as the Assistant Deputy Director for Politico-Military Affairs on the Joint Staff from October 1992 to July 1994. In July 1994, he assumed duties as the Assistant Division Commander (Support), 25th Infantry Division (Light) to include service in Haiti as the Deputy Commanding General, Multinational Force and Deputy Commander, United States Forces, Haiti, United Nations Mission, Haiti. He served as the Deputy Chief of Staff, Operations, United States Army Forces Command, from June 1995 to June 1997. He became Commanding General, 25th Infantry Division (Light) in June 1997, and served in that position until he was named Commanding General, I Corps and Fort Lewis, in September 1999. From 2002 until his retirement, Hill was the Commanding General of the United States Southern Command [SOUTHCOM], overseeing all US military forces in Central and South America

Awards and decorations

Post-military
Hill joined the Board of Trustees for Fraunhofer USA, a bio-technology firm, in 2006. He is also the founder of the J.T. Hill Group, a consulting firm in Coral Gables, Florida. In addition, he an advisor to and on the board of The Protective Group, a Texas-based security firm, and a consultant to Northrop Grumman and the Center for Molecular Biology and Enterprise Technology Partners. He remains involved in Latin American affairs, writing a regular column for the Colombian magazine PODER, and serving on the board of United for Colombia, a non-profit organization for providing medical treatment to landmine victims in Colombia. In Coral Gables he serves on the city's Emergency Management Committee, and he is a national advisor to The Military Child Education Coalition.

References

External links

1946 births
Living people
United States Army generals
United States Army personnel of the Gulf War
United States Army personnel of the Vietnam War
Recipients of the Legion of Merit
Recipients of the Silver Star
Recipients of the Distinguished Service Medal (US Army)
Trinity University (Texas) alumni
Central Michigan University alumni
People from El Paso, Texas
United States Army Command and General Staff College alumni
Recipients of the Defense Superior Service Medal
Military personnel from Dayton, Ohio
National War College alumni
Military personnel from Texas